Donald Frank Cheadle Jr. (born November 29, 1964) is an American actor. He is the recipient of multiple accolades, including two Grammy Awards, a Tony Award, two Golden Globe Awards and two Screen Actors Guild Awards. He has also earned nominations for an Academy Award, two British Academy Film Awards and 11 Primetime Emmy Awards.  His Emmy, Grammy, Oscar and Tony nominations make him one of few black individuals to be nominated for the four major American entertainment awards (EGOT). 

Following early roles in Hamburger Hill (1987), and as the gangster "Rocket" in the film Colors (1988), Cheadle built his career in the 1990s with roles in Devil in a Blue Dress (1995), Rebound: The Legend of Earl 'The Goat' Manigault (1996), Rosewood (1997), and Boogie Nights (1997). His collaboration with director Steven Soderbergh resulted in the films Out of Sight (1998), Traffic (2000), The Ocean's Trilogy (2001–2007), and No Sudden Move (2021). Cheadle was nominated for an Academy Award for Best Actor for his portrayal of Rwandan hotel manager Paul Rusesabagina in the historical drama film Hotel Rwanda (2004). He was the co-producer of Crash, which won the Academy Award for Best Picture in 2005. Cheadle extended his global recognition with his role as James "Rhodey" Rhodes / War Machine in the Marvel Cinematic Universe beginning with Iron Man 2 (2010), replacing Terrence Howard. He will lead the film Armor Wars as part of the franchise. 

His television work includes appearances in Night Court (1988), The Fresh Prince of Bel-Air (1990), Booker (1990), Picket Fences (1993–1995), The Bernie Mac Show (2002), ER (2002), and as Marty Kaan in House of Lies (2012–2016) for which he won a Golden Globe Award in 2013 and four Primetime Emmy Award nominations. From 2019 to 2021, Cheadle starred in the series Black Monday, earning two Emmy Award nominations. 

In 2016, he received his first Grammy Award, winning Best Compilation Soundtrack for Visual Media for the soundtrack Miles Ahead. In 2022, he received a second Grammy for Best Spoken Word Album for his narration of the audiobook Carry On: Reflections for a New Generation from John Lewis; he also received a Tony Award for Best Musical as a producer for the musical A Strange Loop.

Early life
Cheadle was born in Kansas City, Missouri to Bettye Cheadle (née North), a teacher, and Donald Frank Cheadle Sr., a clinical psychologist. He has a sister, Cindy, and a brother, Colin. His family moved from city to city throughout his childhood. He attended Hartley Elementary School in Lincoln, Nebraska from 1970 to 1974. Cheadle graduated in 1982 from East High School in Denver, Colorado. During high school, he played saxophone in the jazz band, sang in choirs, and was active in the theater department, performing in musicals, plays, and mime shows.

Cheadle went on to attend the California Institute of the Arts, graduating with a Bachelor of Fine Arts in theater in 1986.

Career

Cheadle became eligible for his Screen Actors Guild card when he appeared as a burger joint employee in the 1985 comedy Moving Violations. In 1987, he received a small role in the 7th season of Hill Street Blues, where he played a teenager with learning difficulties. This was followed by an appearance in Hamburger Hill the same year. Cheadle secured the role of Jack in the April 1, 1988, "Jung and the Restless" episode of Night Court; although his character was 16 years old, Cheadle was 23 at the time.

Cheadle then played the role of Rocket in the 1988 movie Colors. In 1989, he appeared in a music video for Angela Winbush's number-two hit single "It's the Real Thing" as a car wash employee performing dance moves. In 1990, he appeared in an episode of The Fresh Prince of Bel-Air titled "Homeboy, Sweet Homeboy", playing Will Smith's friend and Hilary's first love interest, Ice Tray. In 1992, he had a starring role in The Golden Girls spin-off The Golden Palace. He subsequently played district attorney John Littleton on three seasons of Picket Fences.

Cheadle first received widespread notice for his portrayal of Mouse Alexander in the 1995 film Devil in a Blue Dress, for which he won Best Supporting Actor awards from the Los Angeles Film Critics Association and the National Society of Film Critics and earned nominations for similar awards from the Screen Actors Guild and the NAACP Image Awards. Following soon thereafter was his performance in the title role of the 1996 HBO TV movie Rebound: The Legend of Earl "The Goat" Manigault. In 1997, he starred in John Singleton's historical drama Rosewood and in the disaster film Volcano. In the same year, he appeared in Paul Thomas Anderson's period drama Boogie Nights. The following year, he appeared in Out of Sight. The film was an adaptation of Elmore Leonard's 1996 novel of the same name and the first of Cheadle's many collaborations with director Steven Soderbergh.

Cheadle’s portrayal of Sammy Davis Jr. in the 1998 TV movie The Rat Pack won him a Golden Globe Award and earned him an Emmy nomination. A year later he starred as Grant Wiggins, a school teacher in the film A Lesson Before Dying, which won the Primetime Emmy Award for Outstanding Television Movie. It was based on the novel of the same name by Ernest J. Gaines. He had two major film roles in 2000, starring as Montel Gordon, a DEA agent in Traffic and as Luke Graham in the sci-fi film Mission to Mars. The following year, he played Basher Tarr in the heist film Ocean's Eleven, a remake of the 1960 Rat Pack original. He joined an ensemble cast including George Clooney, Brad Pitt, Matt Damon, Andy García, and Julia Roberts. Cheadle made a guest appearance in the ninth season of the television series ER, playing the role of Paul Nathan, a medical student who suffers from Parkinson's disease. For this performance he was nominated for an Emmy Award in the category of Outstanding Guest Actor in a Drama Series.

Cheadle appeared in NFL commercials promoting the Super Bowl from 2002 to 2005. He so regularly appeared for the NFL in its Super Bowl advertising that in 2006, in a drive to get fans to submit their own advertising ideas, the NFL sought his permission to reference his previous commercials to portray themselves as having no new ideas: "he quickly signed off on the idea and found it funny." Abe Sutton (along with Etan Bednarsh), one of the finalists in this NFL contest, played on this commercial by proposing an ad in which every player on a football team is Don Cheadle.

In 2005, Cheadle was nominated for the Academy Award for Best Actor for his portrayal of Paul Rusesabagina in the film Hotel Rwanda. He also starred in and co-produced Crash, which won the 2006 Academy Award for Best Picture. For his performance in Crash, Cheadle was nominated for the BAFTA and Screen Actors Guild awards for Best Supporting Actor. He played the main character in the movie Traitor.

In March 2007, Cheadle starred with comedian Adam Sandler in Mike Binder's Reign Over Me, a comedy-drama about a man who has slipped away from reality after the death of his wife and three daughters on 9/11. The film was a box office flop, earning a domestic gross of $22.2 million. Cheadle later starred in the 2009 DreamWorks Pictures film Hotel for Dogs. Cheadle was to make his directorial debut with the adaptation of Elmore Leonard's Tishomingo Blues, but in July 2007, he stated, Tishomingo' is dead..."

In 2009, Cheadle and Boondocks creator Aaron McGruder worked on a potential comedy show on NBC. The "project revolve[d] around mismatched brothers who reunite to open a private security company." Cheadle and McGruder were slated to serve as executive producers, while McGruder was expected to write the script.

Also in 2009, Cheadle performed in The People Speak, a documentary feature film that uses dramatic and musical performances of the letters, diaries, and speeches of everyday Americans, based on historian Howard Zinn's A People's History of the United States and its companion volume Voices of a People’s History of the United States.

In 2010, Cheadle assumed the role of James "Rhodey" Rhodes / War Machine in Iron Man 2 (2010), replacing Terrence Howard. Cheadle reprised this role in the films Iron Man 3 (2013) as the Iron Patriot, Avengers: Age of Ultron (2015), Captain America: Civil War (2016), Avengers: Infinity War (2018), Captain Marvel (2019), and Avengers: Endgame (2019), as well as the Disney+ TV series The Falcon and the Winter Soldier (2021) and What If...?
(2021), and will reprise the role in the upcoming Disney+ series Secret Invasion (2023) and theatrical film Armor Wars (TBA).

From 2012 to 2016, Cheadle starred in the Showtime TV series House of Lies. In 2013, he won the Golden Globe as Best Actor in a Comedy Series for his role on the show. He was in the show for five seasons until it ended in 2016.

Cheadle spent 10 years writing and producing the film Miles Ahead (2016) based on the life of jazz musician Miles Davis. Cheadle also directed and starred in the film. Locations for the movie were found in Cincinnati.

In 2018, Cheadle guest-starred in the first-season finale of DuckTales, providing Donald Duck's new voice box. He later guest-starred again in 2020 during season three after a wish Donald made to Gene the Genie had altered reality.

In 2021, Cheadle starred in the period crime thriller No Sudden Move, in which he played Curt Goynes, a gangster in 1950s Detroit. Around that same year, Cheadle played a villain role in Space Jam: A New Legacy, providing the role of the main antagonist Al-G Rhythm.

Political activism

Cheadle has campaigned to end the genocide in Darfur, Sudan. Cheadle and John Prendergast co-authored a book about this issue entitled Not On Our Watch: The Mission to End Genocide in Darfur and Beyond. With George Clooney, Brad Pitt, Matt Damon, David Pressman and Jerry Weintraub, Cheadle co-founded the Not On Our Watch Project, an organization focusing global attention and resources to stop and prevent mass atrocities. Cheadle was awarded the BET Humanitarian award of the year in 2007 for his humanitarian work for the people of Darfur and Rwanda.

At the 2007 World Series of Poker, Cheadle and poker player Annie Duke organized an annual charity poker tournament, Ante Up for Africa.

On December 13, 2007, Cheadle and fellow actor George Clooney were presented with the Summit Peace Award by the Nobel Peace Prize Laureates in Rome for their work to stop the genocide and relieve the suffering of the people of Darfur.

Cheadle has worked with the United Nations on climate change concerns. He and Harrison Ford created a documentary event series entitled Years of Living Dangerously that provided first-hand reports on those affected by, and seeking solutions to climate change. He is also on the advisory board of Citizens' Climate Lobby.

In 2010, Cheadle was named U.N. Environment Program Goodwill Ambassador. Also in 2010, he and Prendergast published their second book: The Enough Moment: Fighting to End Africa's Worst Human Rights Crimes.

On his 2019 Saturday Night Live appearance, he wore a T-shirt saying "protect trans kids".

Personal life
In 2008, Cheadle's family history was profiled on the PBS series African American Lives 2. A DNA test revealed that Cheadle is of Cameroonian descent. Another DNA test revealed that among his African ancestry, one-third comes from the region from Senegal to Liberia, just over one-quarter comes from the Congo-Angola region, and the rest comes from western Nigeria and Benin.

Cheadle married his long-time partner, actress and Rosewood co-star Bridgid Coulter, in early 2020. The couple has been together for more than 28 years and have two children.

Filmography and awards

References

External links

 
 
 Don Cheadle at UNEP's official website

1964 births
Living people
20th-century American male actors
21st-century American male actors
African-American film directors
African-American film producers
African-American male actors
African-American television producers
American environmentalists
American film producers
American LGBT rights activists
American male film actors
American male television actors
American male voice actors
American people of Cameroonian descent
American people of Tikar descent
American philanthropists
American poker players
Audiobook narrators
Best Musical or Comedy Actor Golden Globe (television) winners
Best Supporting Actor Golden Globe (television) winners
California Institute of the Arts alumni
Film directors from Colorado
Film directors from Missouri
Film producers from Missouri
Grammy Award winners
Male actors from Denver
Male actors from Kansas City, Missouri
Outstanding Performance by a Cast in a Motion Picture Screen Actors Guild Award winners
Television producers from Missouri
Tikar people
Tony Award winners
United Nations goodwill ambassadors